The 1994 Dubai Duty Free Classic was a professional ranking snooker tournament that took place between 30 September to 7 October 1994 at the Al Nasr Stadium in Dubai, United Arab Emirates.

Alan McManus won his first ranking title, defeating Peter Ebdon 9–6 in the final. The defending champion Stephen Hendry was eliminated by McManus in the semi-final.


Prize money
The breakdown of prize money for this year is shown below:

Winner: £40,000
Runner-up: £22,500
Semi-final: £11,250
Quarter-final: £6,250
Last 16: £3,125
Last 32: £2,075
Last 64: £980
Last 96: £595

Pre-televised highest break: £1,000
Televised highest break: £2,000

Main draw

References

Dubai Classic
1994 in snooker
1994 in Emirati sport